Cerro Avispa is a tepui in Amazonas state, Venezuela. Part of the Neblina–Aracamuni Massif, it lies south of Cerro Aracamuni (with which it shares a common slope area) and north of Cerro de la Neblina.

See also
 Distribution of Heliamphora

References

Tepuis of Venezuela
Mountains of Venezuela
Geography of Amazonas (Venezuelan state)